Asexual or Asexuals may refer to:

Asexual reproduction
Asexual reproduction in starfish
Asexuality, the lack of sexual attraction to anyone or lack of interest in or desire for sexual activity.
Gray asexuality, the spectrum between asexuality and sexuality
Asexuals (band), a Canadian punk rock band

See also

Sexlessness (disambiguation)